Charles Content (born February 14, 1987) is a Mauritian football player who currently plays for Pamplemousses SC in the Mauritian Premier League and for the Mauritius national football team as a midfielder. He is featured on the Mauritian national team in the official 2010 FIFA World Cup video game.

References 

1987 births
Living people
Mauritius international footballers
Mauritian footballers
Pamplemousses SC players
Association football midfielders
AS Rivière du Rempart players